Milford is an unincorporated community in Baker County, in the U.S. state of Georgia.

History
A post office called Milford was established in 1852, and remained in operation until 1955. The community took its name from a gristmill at a ford on Itchawaynochaway Creek.

References

Unincorporated communities in Baker County, Georgia
Unincorporated communities in Georgia (U.S. state)